Stef Chura is an American indie rock musician from Detroit, Michigan.

Biography
Chura was originally from Alpena, Michigan. She moved to the Ypsilanti area of Michigan in 2009, where she began playing shows. Chura moved to Detroit in 2012 and began home-recording and self-releasing her songs, while also playing bass in friends’ bands. After years of promoting her home recordings, the death of a close friend prompted Chura to record an album. “One of my best friends passed away and I thought, what do I have to do before I die? I have to at least make one record.”

Career
Chura released her debut full-length album in 2017 titled Messes, to positive reviews from Pitchfork, Rolling Stone, and Exclaim!. In November 2017, Chura announced plans to release a reissue of her album Messes, and that she has signed to Saddle Creek Records, who will put out the reissue. Messes was officially reissued February 2, 2018.

Following the reissue of Messes, Chura told DIY Magazine she is already working on a follow-up album that will be produced by Will Toledo from Car Seat Headrest. On April 21, 2018 (Record Store Day), Chura released a 7-inch, Degrees B/W Sour Honey produced by Toledo. The 7-inch features two songs that were cut from her debut album Messes, “Degrees" and "Sour Honey". Audiofemme gave Degrees B/W Sour Honey a positive review, saying it "show[s] Chura’s range in emotion, voice, and musicianship". Chura's second studio album, Midnight was released on June 7, 2019.

Discography

Studio albums
Messes (2017, Urinal Cake Records)
Midnight (2019, Saddle Creek Records)

Singles
"Degrees" B/W "Sour Honey" (2018, Saddle Creek Records)

References

External links
Official Website

Living people
Musicians from Michigan
People from Alpena, Michigan
Saddle Creek Records artists
Year of birth missing (living people)